Jackie Holmes (born Marion Holmes; September 4, 1920 – March 1, 1995) was an American racecar driver from Indianapolis, Indiana.

Indy 500 results

World Championship career summary
The Indianapolis 500 was part of the FIA World Championship from 1950 through 1960. Drivers competing at Indy during those years were credited with World Championship points and participation. Jackie Holmes participated in 2 World Championship races but scored no World Championship points.

1920 births
1995 deaths
Indianapolis 500 drivers
Racing drivers from Indianapolis